Igors Sokolovs (born 17 August 1974 in Riga) is a Latvian hammer thrower.

He competed at the 2007 World Championships and the 2008 Olympic Games without reaching the final.

His personal best throw is 80.14 metres, achieved in May 2009 in Riga, which so far is the 5th best result in 2009 season in the world.

Achievements

References

External links
 
 
 

1974 births
Living people
Latvian male hammer throwers
Olympic athletes of Latvia
Athletes (track and field) at the 2008 Summer Olympics
Athletes (track and field) at the 2012 Summer Olympics
Athletes from Riga